Jacob Berry (born May 5, 2001) is an American professional baseball third baseman and right fielder in the Miami Marlins organization. He previously played college baseball for Louisiana State University and the University of Arizona.

Amateur career
Berry attended Queen Creek High School in Queen Creek, Arizona. After graduating in 2020, he enrolled at the University of Arizona to play college baseball for the Arizona Wildcats. In 2021, his freshman year, he appeared in 63 games (making 62 starts), slashing .352/.439/.676 with 17 home runs, 70 runs batted in (RBIs), 19 doubles, and 54 runs scored, earning multiple All-American honors. He spent a majority of the season as a designated hitter but also played nine games at third base. He was also named to the Pac-12 All Conference Team. He played with the USA Baseball Collegiate National Team that summer.

Following the end of the 2021 season, Arizona head coach Jay Johnson announced he would be leaving the team to become the head coach for the LSU Tigers. After the announcement, Berry entered the transfer portal before announcing shortly after that he would be transferring to LSU. Berry entered the 2022 season as a top prospect for the upcoming draft. He began starting in right field (alongside spending some time at third base) for the Tigers. He missed a brief period during the season after breaking his finger. Over 53 games, he batted .370 with 15 home runs and 48 RBIs and was named an All-American. Following the season's end, he traveled to San Diego where he participated in the Draft Combine.

Professional career
The Miami Marlins selected Berry in the first round with the sixth overall selection of the 2022 Major League Baseball draft. He signed with the team for $6 million. He made his professional debut in late July with the Rookie-level Florida Complex League Marlins. After four games, he was promoted to the Jupiter Hammerheads of the Single-A Florida State League. Over 37 games between the two teams, he batted .248 with three home runs and 26 RBIs.

Personal life
Berry's father, Perry, was drafted by the Houston Astros in 1990 and played in the minor leagues for four years.

References

External links

2001 births
Living people
People from Queen Creek, Arizona
Baseball players from Arizona
Baseball infielders
Arizona Wildcats baseball players
LSU Tigers baseball players
United States national baseball team players
Florida Complex League Marlins players